Silencer may refer to:

 Silencer (firearms), a muzzle device that suppresses acoustic intensity; a.k.a. a suppressor for this reason
 Muffler, or silencer in British English, a device to reduce the noise of an engine's exhaust
 Sound trap, or silencer, a device to reduce mechanical equipment noise

Fictional characters
 Silencer (comics), the name of different characters in Marvel Comics
 Silencers, in the Crusader: No Remorse game
 Silencer, a nickname given to another character in the film 3 Idiots
 Silencer, a supporting Arrow character
 The Silencer, in The New Age of DC Heroes

Film and television
 The Silencers (novel), a 1962 Matt Helm novel by Donald Hamilton
 The Silencers (film), a 1966 Matt Helm film
 "Silencer", an episode of CSI: Miami (season 4)
 "Silencer", an episode of Law & Order: Criminal Intent (season 6)
 The Silencer (film), a 2000 action film

Music
 Silencer (band), a Swedish black metal band
 Silencer (Blake Morgan album), 2006
 Silencer (Nels Cline Trio album), 1992
 Silencer (Zed album), 2000 
 "Silencer", a song by The Haunted from the 2000 album Made Me Do It

Other uses
 Silencer (genetics), a DNA sequence capable of binding transcription regulation factors
 Silencer (Judge Dredd novel), by David Bishop, 1994
 Silencer (poetry collection), by Marcus Wicker, 2017
 Silencer (video game), 1998

See also

 The Silencers (disambiguation)